The Goshen Primitive Baptist Church is a historic Primitive Baptist church in Winchester, Kentucky.  The congregation was founded in 1792.  Its brick church building was built in c.1850. It was added to the National Register of Historic Places in 1979.

It has Greek Revival-style original details.

References

See also
National Register of Historic Places listings in Kentucky

Baptist churches in Kentucky
Churches on the National Register of Historic Places in Kentucky
Churches in Clark County, Kentucky
Churches completed in 1850
19th-century Baptist churches in the United States
National Register of Historic Places in Clark County, Kentucky
1850 establishments in Kentucky
Primitive Baptists
Greek Revival church buildings in Kentucky